Hedkan (also Romanized as Ḩedkān; also known as Hedgān) is a village in Irandegan Rural District, Irandegan District, Khash County, Sistan and Baluchestan Province, Iran. At the 2006 census, its population was 133, in 29 families.

References 

Populated places in Khash County